"Lisa with an 'S" is the seventh episode of the twenty-seventh season of the American animated television series The Simpsons, and the 581st episode of the series overall. It aired in the United States on Fox on November 22, 2015. This marks the final episode to credit Sam Simon as executive producer until "Lisa the Veterinarian".

Plot
Homer, Moe, Lenny, Carl and Barney start the episode by singing a parody of Tonight as they prepare for the poker night at Moe's bar. On his way out, Homer promises Lisa that if he wins, he will pay for her to attend an elite band camp she has been accepted to, a camp that is the best one on their side of the Mississippi River (which side they are talking about is left unspecified). But Homer fails on a full house and ends up losing $5,000 to Broadway legend Laney Fontaine, who is now dating Moe because he has a liquor license. Trying to convince Laney to give his money back, he invites her to dinner to show her how miserable they are. Lisa asks her to sing a song while she plays the saxophone, making Laney realize that Lisa has a lot of talent and could become a famous showbiz kid. She offers to clear the debt if she can take Lisa to New York City for a month to perform on her Broadway shows. Marge is reluctant, but agrees after Grampa says this may be the only opportunity for Lisa to live her dreams.

In New York, after meeting Lisa's former ballet teacher Chazz Busby, Lisa easily passes the audition and gets cast in one of the Broadway shows. Later, during a Skype conversation, Marge believes that Lisa is not in a good place and decides to take the family to New York to get her back. On their way there, the family encounters Ned Flanders' Amish cousin Jacob in Pennsylvania and learn that Ned is now considered "ultra liberal" and a black sheep because he lives in the modern world. In New York, the Simpsons and even Marge realize that Lisa fits right into the Broadway show world and they decide to go back to Springfield without her. Laney sees Marge's sacrifice and, having a change of heart, immediately kicks Lisa out of the show on the grounds that Lisa got more cheers than her, leaving Lisa free to return home with the Simpsons.

The episode ends with Homer taking Jacob to Ned's house where Jacob makes Ned realize that he is guilty of pride. Both cousins reconcile by hugging Homer, much to his annoyance.

Reception
"Lisa with an 'S" scored a 2.3 rating and was watched by 5.64 million viewers, making the episode Fox's highest rated show of the night.

Dennis Perkins of The A.V. Club gave the episode a C+ saying, "Could this heap of half-realized plots coalesce into a satisfying episode of The Simpsons? Sure—if any of them were funny on its own, or if they all somehow tied together in the end. Instead, 'Lisa With An "S just sort of exists, the final description of a lot of latter-day episodes (although there have also been a couple of genuinely great episodes this season). It wasn’t abysmal or infuriating—at least that would leave something to talk about. This episode was just... there."

References

External links 
 

2015 American television episodes
The Simpsons (season 27) episodes